"One More Chance / Stay with Me (Remix)" is a song written and recorded by American rapper The Notorious B.I.G., featuring additional vocals sung by his wife Faith Evans, Keisha Spivey from Total and an uncredited appearance by Mary J. Blige. It was certified platinum by the RIAA on July 31, 1995 and sold 1.1 million copies.

The original version of the song appears on B.I.G.'s album, Ready to Die. The remix features new lyrics, a new chorus, and a different beat than the original. There is also a "hip hop mix" that samples Marley Marl's "Droppin Science" (featuring rapper Craig G). Evans was an up-and-coming R&B artist at the time. The remix, produced by Rashad Smith, samples DeBarge's 1983 song "Stay with Me".

The song topped the Hot R&B/Hip-Hop Songs chart and peaked at number 2 on the Billboard Hot 100. At the time it would become tied as the highest debuting single in the history of the Hot 100, along with Michael Jackson and Janet Jackson song "Scream", when it entered the chart at number five. It would maintain the record of highest debuting song until Michael Jackson's "You Are Not Alone" debuted at number one and would remain the highest debuting single for a rap song on the Hot 100 until Puff Daddy's "I'll Be Missing You", a tribute to the then-recently deceased Smalls, became the first of many hip-hop songs to debut in the top spot.

Synopsis
The song begins as a recording of an answering machine message in which one of B.I.G's daughters, having apparently been prompted by her mother, requests that women stop calling the household. This is followed by a number of messages left by jilted former lovers expressing a mixture of fondness, yearning, contempt and confusion towards Biggie.

Following the introduction, the song largely centers on the rapper's sexual prowess. B.I.G makes a number of claims, such as comparing his sexual performance to the famous boxing match the Thrilla in Manila, and asserting that he has a very large and desirable penis.

Aside from the above claims, B.I.G also expresses, towards the end of the song, that he prefers relationships based around sex, and prefers the women leave him alone afterwards. This is implicitly suggested to be the result of women having become too attached to him in the past, and it is alleged that some have stalked him. The song closes with the titular chorus, which is a refrain of a female voice asking, 'Oh, Biggie, give me one more chance'.

"A hot record," remarked Jay-Z. "Sonically, it was amazing."

Ready to Die version
The version that is on Ready to Die was produced by Sean Combs and features R&B trio Total and not Faith Evans. It samples "Hydra" by Grover Washington, Jr. and features an interpolation of "I Want You Back" by the Jackson 5 on the chorus. The lyrics on the album version are different and more profane from both remixes.

Lil' Cease's niece provides the voice of the child on Biggie's answering machine. His sister and her friends played the various women who leave messages.

The original beat of the original version has a sample of DeBarge's "All This Love" and it can be found on D.J. Semi's Ready to Die: The O.G. Version.

Other versions

"One More Chance / Stay with Me (Remix)" (additional vocals by Faith Evans) – The official remix to the original version. The remix has a completely different sound than the original. It was produced by Rashad Smith and samples "Stay with Me" by DeBarge. Appears on the single and the popular version. A music video was made for this song. The video was directed by Hype Williams and features appearances by Total, Luther Campbell, Heavy D, Mary J. Blige, Faith Evans, Spike Lee, Da Brat, Jermaine Dupri, D-Nice, Patra, Miss Jones, Queen Latifah, Craig Mack, Cypress Hill, Tyson Beckford, Aaliyah, Changing Faces, Kid Capri, Junior Mafia, Zhane, and P. Diddy.

"One More Chance (Hip Hop Remix)" (featuring Total) - Also appears on the single and uses the verses from the "Stay with Me" remix except the beat and chorus is different. Also appears on the clean version of Ready to Die (instead of the original). Samples Lou Donaldson's "Who's Making Love?".

"Want That Old Thing Back" (featuring Ja Rule & Ralph Tresvant) - Appears on Greatest Hits and the bonus disc of Duets: The Final Chapter and features a different beat as well as a chorus by Tresvant and a verse by Ja Rule. Uses Biggie's verses from the original "One More Chance".

"Only One Thing" (featuring Lil' Kim) - Appears on Mick Boogie's Unbelievable mixtape and has a chorus and verse by Kim and uses Biggie's first verse from the original "One More Chance".

"Foolish"/"Unfoolish" - A single by Ashanti. The song samples "Stay with Me" by DeBarge so it uses the same beat as the "One More Chance" / "Stay with Me" remix. A remix, "Unfoolish", was made which features Biggie's first verse from "Fucking You Tonight" as the third verse. "Unfoolish" appears on We Invented the Remix Vol. 1 and Ashanti's debut album. The song would later feature R. Kelly on his album Life After Death, which was released after his shooting in 1997.

"One More Chance / The Legacy (Remix)" (featuring Faith Evans & CJ Wallace (their son)) - The official remix to the "Stay with Me" remix. Appears on the soundtrack of Notorious B.I.G.'s biopic Notorious.

This song played as tribute to Biggie in the Up in Smoke Tour, which was in 2000. Snoop Dogg announced that Biggie was his friend and wished the two had a better relationship before he passed. Snoop Dogg and Dr. Dre played this song as homage to Biggie.

"M.V.P" - A single by Big L. This song samples "Stay with Me" by DeBarge and has the same meter and cadence as "One More Chance". It was released 2 months earlier and was produced by Lord Finesse.

Music video
The music video features cameos by Heavy D, Craig Mack, Aaliyah, and Da Brat.

Track listings

12" vinyl single

A-side
 "One More Chance / Stay with Me" (radio edit 1) – 4:15
 "One More Chance" (hip hop mix) – 5:05
 "One More Chance / Stay with Me" (radio edit 2) – 4:35
 "One More Chance" (hip hop instrumental) – 5:08

B-side
 "One More Chance" (hip hop radio edit) – 4:24
 "The What" (radio edit) – 4:08 
 "One More Chance / Stay with Me" (instrumental) – 4:35

CD single
 "One More Chance / Stay with Me" (radio edit 1) – 4:17
 "One More Chance" (hip hop mix) – 5:07
 "One More Chance / Stay with Me" (radio edit 2) – 4:37
 "The What" (radio edit) – 4:00

Cassette single

Side one
 "One More Chance" (radio edit 1)
 "One More Chance" (hip hop radio edit)
 "The What" (radio edit)

Side two
 "One More Chance" (hip hop mix)
 "One More Chance" (radio edit 2)

Charts

Weekly charts

Year-end charts

Certifications

See also
List of number-one R&B singles of 1995 (U.S.)

Notes

References

1995 singles
Faith Evans songs
Music videos directed by Hype Williams
The Notorious B.I.G. songs
Bad Boy Records singles
Songs written by the Notorious B.I.G.
Songs written by Sean Combs
Songs written by Rashad Smith